Mona Makram-Ebeid (born 20 March 1943 in Qena) is an Egyptian politician and academic, Professor of Political Science and Political Sociology at the American University of Cairo.

Life
From a Coptic Wafdist family prominent in Egyptian politics, Mona Makram-Ebeid was inspired and learnt much from her uncle as a child, the politician Makram Ebeid. She was educated at Harvard University, the University of Cairo and the American University of Cairo.

She joined the Wafd Party in 1983, but from 1990 to 1995 was appointed by President Mubarak as a member of the People's Assembly of Egypt. She returned to the Wafd Party, though left that to join Ayman Nour’s El-Ghad Party. Rejoining the Wafd Party, she resigned for a third time after the Egyptian revolution of 2011, criticizing the actions of the coalition between the Wafd party and the Muslim Brotherhood.

Her cousin is Nadia Makram Ebeid who served as the minister of state for environment (1997–2002).

References

External links
 Mona Makram Ebeid

1943 births
Living people
People from Qena
Coptic politicians
Egyptian politicians
Egyptian political scientists
Harvard University alumni
Cairo University alumni
The American University in Cairo alumni
Academic staff of The American University in Cairo
Women political scientists